Nasirabad Division is an administrative division of Balochistan Province, Pakistan. It is the only Irrigation & Agricultural Division of Balochistan, The division connects Balochistan with Sindh. Nasirabad division created by bifurcation of Sibi division in 1987. Its Divisional headquarters are at Dera Murad Jamali.

Thus division facing many issues including road problems, water irrigation, lacks basic facilities for public, lack of public university and many more issues.

As per the 2017 Census of Pakistan, the division has a population of about 1,661,077.

Cities of Naseerabad Division:

 Usta Muhammad
 Dera Murad Jamali (Tipull)
 Dera Allah Yar (Jhatpat)
 Gandawah
 Sohbatpur
 Dhadhar
 Gandakha
 Bakhtiarabad (Bellpat)
 Kolpur
 Machh, Bolan

Districts 
Naseerabad Division contains following Districts:

 Kachhi District
 Jaffarabad District
 Jhal Magsi District
 Nasirabad District
 Sohbatpur District
 Usta Muhammad District

Demographics 
According to 2017 census, Nasirabad division had a population of 1,661,077, which includes 858,420 males and 802,584 females. 
Nasirabad division constitutes  1,643,567 Muslims, 15,016 Hindus, 671 Christians followed by 849 scheduled castes and 974 others.

References

Divisions of Balochistan